The Seinel is a right tributary of the river Someș in Romania. It discharges into the Someș in Seini.

References

Rivers of Romania
Rivers of Maramureș County